Alexander Deichsel (born 23 February 1935) is a German sociologist and professor at the University of Hamburg (Germany).

Deichsel completed his abitur at the Christianeum Hamburg.

He is the founder of sociology of brand (Markensoziologie) and co-editor of the Complete Works of Ferdinand Tönnies.

Works 
 Markensoziologie (in German), Frankfurt on Main, 2006

References

German sociologists
1935 births
Living people
German male writers
Academic staff of the University of Hamburg